12 Golden Ducks is a 2015 Hong Kong comedy film directed by Matt Chow and starring Sandra Ng. It was scheduled for release on 19 February 2015.

Like the previous 3 prostitution-themed comedy films starring Ng, i.e. Golden Chicken (2002), Golden Chicken 2 (2003) and Golden Chicken 3 (2014), it was released on Chinese New Year.

Cast
 Sandra Ng
 Louis Koo
 Nicholas Tse
 Simon Yam
 Joey Yung
 Chrissie Chau
 Anthony Wong
 Zhao Wei
 Michelle Chen
 Fiona Sit
 Eason Chan
 Ivana Wong
 Eddie Peng
 Luhan
 Wilfred Lau
 Babyjohn Choi
 Dada Chan
 Pakho Chau
 Kelvin Kwan
 Philip Keung
 Carman Lee
 Joyce Cheng
 Isabella Leong
 Michelle Loo
 Wyman Wong
 Louis Yuen
 Michelle Wai
 Lo Hoi-pang
 Benz Hui

References

External links

Official Trailer

2015 comedy films
Films directed by Matt Chow
Hong Kong comedy films
2010s Hong Kong films
2010s Cantonese-language films